Skookum is a word derived from the Chinook Jargon common in regional English in the Pacific Northwest region of North America. It may also refer to a mythical monster or a doll (as discussed in main article).

Skookum may also refer to:
 Skookum (cat), a breed of cat
 Skookum WCT Cash Spiel, a curling tournament from 2006 to 2010
 , a Canadian ferry 
 , a Canadian ferry
 Skookums, a dog in Ernest Thompson Seton's 1911 book Rolf in the Woods
 Skookum, a Mallet steam locomotive under restoration by Oregon Coast Scenic Railroad

See also
Big Skookum or Hammersley Inlet, Washington state, United States
Little Skookum Inlet, Washington state